Dream is a 1943 Soviet drama film directed by Mikhail Romm.

Plot
The film is set in 1933.

From poor villages in Western Ukraine, at that time belonging to Poland, thousands of people are going to cities in search of work and happiness. Among them is Anna. After working all night as a janitor at a local restaurant, in the morning she returns to her duties as a servant in a rooming house proudly named as "Dream". All inhabitants of the guest house are people broken by life, vainly trying to straighten up, but despite all efforts, somehow tolerate defeat in the battle against the ruthless world. And at the head of this ship which is about to go down, stands Madame Skorokhodova, who is convinced that she really made it. Paradoxically her compassion mixes with fierce ruthlessness to those below her social status, all-consuming greed and the similarly boundless love for her loser son, for whom she has lived, worked, committed vile acts, while knowing in her heart the futility of these efforts.

Cast 
 Yelena Kuzmina - Anna
 Vladimir Solovyov - Vasil, Anna's brother
 Vladimir Shcheglov - Tomash, worker 
 Faina Ranevskaya - Madame Rosa Skorokhodova
 Arkadi Kislyakov - Lazar Skorokhod
 Ada Vojtsik - Vanda
 Mikhail Astangov - Stanislav Komorovsky
 Mikhail Bolduman - Zygmunt Dombek
 Rostislav Plyatt - Yanek, cabdriver
 Nikolay Orlov - Old weaver
 Pyotr Glebov

References

External links 

1943 drama films
1943 films
Soviet drama films
Films directed by Mikhail Romm
Soviet black-and-white films

Films set in Poland
Films set in Ukraine
Films set in 1933
1940s Russian-language films